Collinsia parviflora is a species of flowering plant in the family Plantaginaceae (previously Scrophulariaceae) known by the common names maiden blue eyed Mary and small-flowered collinsia.

This tiny wildflower is a common plant throughout much of western and northern North America, where it grows in moist, shady mountain forests.

Description
Collinsia parviflora is an annual plant with a spindly reddish stem and narrow lance-shaped green leaves with edges that curl under.

The minuscule flowers grow singly or in loose clusters of several flowers. Each flower has five lobes, the lower deep blue to purple and the upper white. The whole corolla is only a few millimeters across.

The fruit is a small capsule.

References

External links

Jepson Manual Treatment of Collinsia parviflora
Collinsia parviflora  U.C. Photo gallery

parviflora
Flora of the Northwestern United States
Flora of the Southwestern United States
Flora of the North-Central United States
Flora of Western Canada
Flora without expected TNC conservation status